The Cameroon women's national handball team is the national team of Cameroon. It takes part in international handball competitions. The team first participated in an IHF World Women's Handball Championship in 2005, where they placed 22nd.

Results

World Championship
2005 – 22nd place
2017 – 20th place
2021 – 28th place
2023 – Qualified

African Championship
1979 – 2nd place
1983 – 3rd place
1985 – 3rd place
1987 – 2nd place
1996 – 5th place
1998 – 4th place
2000 – 4th place
2002 – 5th place
2004 – 2nd place
2006 – 5th place
2008 – 7th place
2010 – 7th place
2012 – 5th place
2014 – 7th place
2016 – 3rd place
2018 – 4th place
2021 – 2nd place
2022 – 2nd place

Current squad
Squad for the 2021 World Women's Handball Championship.

Head coach: Serge Christian Guébogo

References

External links

IHF profile

Handball
Women's national handball teams
National team